Raipur Central Jail is one of the 5 central Jails in Chhattisgarh. The total capacity of this jail is of 1100 people. However, it is reported that at any given time, there are more than double inmates than the capacity of the jail. Many inmates of this jail was granted bail when the Corona Virus pandemic has struck. Raipur Central Jail was constructed during British Raj and had several freedom fighters as inmates. In 2016, on Gandhi Jayanti (02-October), the inmates had launched a hungerstrike as Satyagrah, demanding minimum wages, bank accounts and improved living facilities. In 2019, one of the medical officers of Raipur Central Jail was accused of offering preferential treatment to richer inmates and ignoring those who were poor.

Notable inmates 

 Binayak Sen
Soni Sori

References 

Prisons in India